Beijing Electronic Science and Technology Institute  is a university in Beijing, China. It is a major research institute of information security in China. It consists of five departments. It belongs to the General Office of the Chinese Communist Party.

External links 

 

Universities and colleges in Beijing
Central Committee of the Chinese Communist Party
Educational institutions established in 1947
1947 establishments in China